Yeshwant Ghadge  (16 November 1921 – 10 July 1944) was an Indian recipient of the Victoria Cross, the highest and most prestigious award for gallantry in the face of the enemy that can be awarded to British and Commonwealth forces.

Details 
He served in the 5th Mahratta Light Infantry in the British Indian Army during World War II. He was mentioned in dispatches in 1941 while a Sepoy. He had been promoted to Naik and was 22 years old when he performed the following deed for which he was awarded the VC.

On 10 July 1944 in the Upper Tiber Valley, Italy, a rifle section commanded by Naik Yeshwant Ghadge came under heavy machine-gun fire at close range which killed or wounded all members of the section except the commander. Without hesitation Naik Yeshwant Ghadge rushed the machine-gun position, first throwing a grenade which knocked out the machine-gun and firer and then shooting one of the gun crew. Finally, having no time to change his magazine, he clubbed to death the two remaining members of the crew. He fell mortally wounded, shot by an enemy sniper.

The citation reads:

With no known grave, Ghadge is remembered at the Cassino Memorial.

To commemorate his sacrifice a statue is placed near the tahasil office, Mangaon in Raigad District.

Notes

References
Monuments to Courage (David Harvey, 1999)
The Register of the Victoria Cross (This England, 1997)

External links
 Yashwant Ghadge
Medal entitlement
Burial location

1921 births
1944 deaths
Indian World War II recipients of the Victoria Cross
British Indian Army soldiers
Indian Army personnel killed in World War II
Military personnel from Maharashtra
People from Raigad district